Microsoft Kaizala is a secure messaging and work management software application for collaboration among users inside and outside of organizations, including the ability to send and receive instant messages, coordinate tasks, and submit invoices. It was launched in India in 2017, thereafter expanded to 28 countries, and was launched globally in April 2019 as part of the Office 365 package. It is available internationally, except in a few countries  as a free Android, iOS, and web application. Kai zala is a Marathi phrase (काय झालं) that means "What happened?"

Microsoft Kaizala has been optimised to work on 2G networks to enable connectivity in remote locations and offers features with offline support. Kaizala users can assign jobs to their field employees, conduct surveys, share attachments and more, all within an easy-to-use application.

Microsoft Kaizala has seen a significant adoption among Indian organizations such as YES Bank, Apollo Telemedicine, Republic TV, United Phosphorus Limited and Kendriya Vidyalaya Sangathan who are currently piloting the solution for their internal teams.  In addition, the Government of Andhra Pradesh is one of the first government organizations to use Microsoft Kaizala for real time governance. More than 30 government departments and over 70,000 users in the State Government use Microsoft Kaizala for day-to-day work.

In July 2019, Microsoft announced that Kaizala Pro's capabilities would be gradually adopted in Microsoft Teams over the next 12 to 18 months, and that Teams would eventually replace Kaizala as a single collaboration solution. Kaizala will finally be retired in favour of Teams on August 31, 2023.

History
Microsoft Kaizala was initiated as a product under Microsoft Garage and was later fully integrated as a standalone product/Office 365. Corporate Vice President Rajiv Kumar, conceived the idea of the product for mobile phone users who are on the go, and rely on their phones to do much of their work. For over a year, he engaged himself with customers across the world to elicit their views on its functionality and obtained feedback. As chat applications and plugging-in of consumer technologies in organisations work-flows began taking primacy over other modes of communication, the infusion of points of view obtained from the feedback became central to the making of Kaizala. The Microsoft Office team in India learned through multiple interactions with focus groups and personal interviews that most businesses and individuals were not just mobile-first, but even mobile-only. They indeed wanted better mobile apps for their phones to perform three key functions – create content on the fly, manage contacts in a phone-based customer relationship management system, and have a shared, secure mobile environment for teams to collaborate.

Celebrating the first anniversary release of Kaizala through Microsoft Garage, CEO Satya Nadella announced the product in preview in the "Future Decoded", an event focused on India. In fact, Kaizala was launched as a Garage project on 22 February 2016. Andhra Pradesh government has begun using it by April 2016 for group communication among its officials during large-scale events. Kaizala was first used to effectively manage and coordinate a festival attended by 20 million people. This led to many other organisations in the country too began using it.

With the growing digital payment culture in India, Microsoft introduced digital payments services in its social network app Kaizala. Payment integration would enable users to quickly send or receive money without leaving the app. Kaizala has seen a strong uptake across banking and financial services to help customers connect and collaborate. By integrating the payment of both organisations’ mobile payment infrastructure services of Yes Bank and MobiKwik users may swiftly send or receive money. Microsoft Kaizala users will have the option to make P2P payments in one to one and group chat conversations via the MobiKwik wallet and via Yes Bank’s Unified Payment Interface (UPI) integration.

Kaizala expanded its operations in South Africa as part of enabling businesses to embrace the fourth industrial revolution and digitally transform their operations.

Features
Microsoft Kaizala connects users with their employees, irrespective of their physical locations, helps collect data even from large groups, assimilate insights and generate automated reports. For ease in workplace coordination, task monitoring, assigning of jobs, performance tracking and scheduling of meetings could be handled through the App. Custom "actions" could be built based on business needs through open API systems.

Workflow management
Message broadcasts
Surveys and polls
Integration with third-party applications
Extensibility through REST APIs
Job and task assignments
Reports for visualising productivity trends and performance
Power BI-based dashboard
Controlled access and security features
Quick on-boarding and group management

Future development 
Microsoft Kaizala will be integrated with its Teams collaboration platform in June–December 2020, according to Microsoft’s blog post in June 2019. This integration is part of a larger plan to appeal to the "first-line workers" like retail, healthcare and service employees. 
Having a Microsoft account is not mandatory for users to access Kaizala. They can directly sign up with their phone number. Experts feel that the "open directory" approach has made it easy even for temporary employees and contractors to access the service. 
Kaizala’s future roadmap features are likely to be launched  in a few months. They include support for languages like Arabic and Hebrew which have right-to-left scripts, Azure Active Directory sync within Kaizala, email invites for new users, and the ability to assign dedicated admins to manage Kaizala policies. Microsoft in its blog post on April 4, 2019 said that the capabilities of Kaizala would complement the robust communication and collaboration features of Microsoft Teams, the hub for teamwork in Microsoft 365.

See also
 Comparison of instant messaging clients
 Internet privacy
 Secure instant messaging

References

External links

Microsoft Store License
Microsoft Kaizala For Web

Mobile software
Windows Phone software
Microsoft software
Office 365
Android (operating system) software
IOS software
2017 software